José Miguel (born June 23, 1969 in Temperley) is a retired Argentine football goalkeeper. He played professional football in Argentina and Mexico.

Career
Miguel began his playing career in 1986 with River Plate where he made a total of 39 league appearances and won two league titles with the club. In 1993, he joined Club Atlético Platense where he served as the first team goalkeeper.

In 1995, he joined Mexican side Santos Laguna where he played until 1999. During his time with the club he won one league title in Inviero 1996 and made

In 2000, he joined Atlético Chipas where he played until 2002. Miguel returned to Argentina in 2003 to play for his home town club Temperley. He retired from football in 2004.

Titles
Primera División Argentina(2): 1989-90, Apertura 1991
Primera División de Mexico (1): Inviero 1996

External links
 Profile at Medio Tiempo
 BDFA profile
 Argentine Primera statistics

People from Temperley
Sportspeople from Buenos Aires Province
Argentine footballers
Association football goalkeepers
Club Atlético River Plate footballers
Club Atlético Platense footballers
Santos Laguna footballers
Argentine Primera División players
Liga MX players
Argentine expatriate footballers
Expatriate footballers in Mexico
1969 births
Living people